{{Infobox animanga/Video
| type            = film
| director        = Kitaro Kosaka
| producer        = 
| writer          = Reiko Yoshida
| music           = Keiichi Suzuki
| studio          = DLEMadhouse
| licensee        = {{English anime licensee
  | AUS = 
  | BI = Manga Entertainment
  | NA  = GKIDS<ref name=Fathom>{{cite web |title=Okko's Inn' |url=https://www.fathomevents.com/events/okkos-inn?date=2019-04-22%2000:00:00.000 |publisher=Fathom Events |access-date=February 7, 2019}}</ref>
}}
| released        = 
| runtime         = 94 minutes
}}

 is a series of Japanese children's novels, written by Hiroko Reijō and illustrated by Asami. Kodansha released twenty volumes between 2003 and 2013 under the imprint of Aoi Tori Bunko. A manga adaptation with art by Eiko Ōuchi was serialized in Kodansha's shōjo manga Nakayoshi and collected in seven tankōbon volumes.

Plot
After her parents died in a car accident and had lost her memory, Oriko "Okko" Seki lives with her grandmother at the Hananoyu Inn, a ryokan. Okko befriends the ghost of a boy Makoto "Uribo" Tachiuri, the late childhood friend of Mineko. Okko becomes a junior innkeeper. At first, she finds her job exhausting, but Uribo keeps her spirits up. One day, Okko invites a disheveled man and his son to the inn, since it "rejects no one". The staff learn about his late mother and Akane end up opposing everyone. He requests a cake from the kitchen. The inn has none, but Okko feels inspired to make a new recipe for a "hot bath" pudding resembling hot spring water. Akane and his father are impressed about the pudding and the shrine. It is revealed Okko achieves her fulfillment for everyone and Akane's father writes a magazine review. At school, Okko meets Matsuki Akino, a selfish girl with a pink colored Lolita fashion whose family runs the inn. Uribo tries to provoke Matsuki by painting her face, but a blond girl ghost retaliates by painting Okko's. The ghost turns out to by Miyo, Matsuki's late sister. She mocks Okko and something what she did. But since Okko can see her and talk with her, Miyo plans to move at Hananoyu Inn instead of Harunoya. Okko uses a bell received from her late grandfather to release Suzuki, a low key demon, whom Okko meets with a bad habit. Okko becomes cheerier, though Suzuki notices Okko cannot see ghosts. One of the guests is a woman named Glory Suiryo who works as a fortune teller. She invites Okko to a shopping trip. Okko is paralyzed by a flashback, but Glory comforts her. Okko imagines her parents near her. As the Kise family arrive at the inn, they include a boy named Shota and his recovered father. The man finds bland food unsatisfying. Okko learns Matsuki was working on a menu. Setting aside her rivalry to please a guest, she visits Matsuki at her inn to ask for help. Matsuki gives her a sample of beef and cooking tips Shota's father does not taste so bland. But then the Kises reveal Shota's father survived the accident and was in a coma. The family that died in the crash didn't make it, only leaving their only daughter alive. Okko started to remember that it was her parents who died in the accident and leaves. Glory consoles with Okko. She sees the Kises leaving the inn, because they will soon leave. Okko invites the Kises to stay at the inn. Months later, Okko and Matsuki perform a ritual dance at the festival. The ghosts move on to the next lives and visit them someday.

Voice cast

Release
An anime television series aired from April 8 to September 23, 2018, and was produced by DLE and Madhouse. The anime film premiered at the Annecy International Animation Film Festival on June 11, 2018 and on September 12 in France and September 21 in Japan. It was licensed by GKIDS in North America, and was released in the United States on 22 and 23 April 2019. The film was released on DVD and Blu-ray by Shout! Factory on July 2, 2019.

Reception
Novel
The novel series has over 3 million volumes in print.

Anime filmOkko's Inn'' received the Excellence Award in the animation category at the 22nd Japan Media Arts Festival. The film was nominated for an Annie Award for Best Animated Feature - Independent.

References

External links

  
  
  
  
 
 
 

2003 Japanese novels
Anime and manga based on novels
Japanese children's novels
Japanese serial novels
Novels set in hotels
Kodansha books
Kodansha manga
Madhouse (company)
Shōjo manga
TV Tokyo original programming
Japanese ghost films
Ghost novels
Supernatural anime and manga
Shinto in fiction
2010s children's animated films
2010s Japanese films